Emerson Rivaldo Rodríguez Valois (born 25 August 2000) is a Colombian professional footballer who plays as a winger for Liga MX club Santos Laguna, on loan from Inter Miami CF.

Career statistics

Club

Notes

References

2000 births
Living people
People from Buenaventura, Valle del Cauca
Colombian footballers
Association football forwards
Categoría Primera B players
Categoría Primera A players
Millonarios F.C. players
Valledupar F.C. footballers
Inter Miami CF players
Inter Miami CF II players
Colombian expatriate footballers
Colombian expatriate sportspeople in the United States
Expatriate soccer players in the United States
Major League Soccer players
Sportspeople from Valle del Cauca Department
MLS Next Pro players
21st-century Colombian people